Multiclass may refer to:

 Multiclass classification, in machine learning
 Having multiple character classes in a role-playing game
 Character class (Dungeons & Dragons)#Multiclassing